Adrien Alfredo Perez (born October 13, 1995) is an American professional soccer player who plays as a forward for San Diego Loyal SC in USL Championship.

Career 
Perez spent two seasons in the Major Arena Soccer League for the Ontario Fury, where he was leading all MASL players in goals. He was called into LAFC training camp early in 2019, and in April 2019 he signed for Los Angeles FC in Major League Soccer. He was released by Los Angeles following their 2020 season.

Perez was selected by D.C. United in the 2020 MLS re-entry draft. He officially joined the club on January 6, 2021. In a match against the Philadelphia Union on July 17, 2021, Perez sustained a foot injury. Following the 2022 season, his contract option was declined by D.C. United.

On December 5, 2022, Perez returned to the Empire Strykers.

On February 28, 2023, Perez signed with USL Championship side San Diego Loyal.

Career statistics

Club

References

External links
Adrien Perez at Major League Soccer
Adrien Perez at Major Arena Soccer League

1995 births
Living people
American soccer players
Loyola Marymount Lions men's soccer players
Portland Timbers U23s players
FC Golden State Force players
Los Angeles FC players
San Diego Loyal SC players
American sportspeople of Mexican descent
Association football forwards
Soccer players from Los Angeles
Major League Soccer players
USL Championship players
USL League Two players
Major Arena Soccer League players
Ontario Fury players
D.C. United players